The flag of the Czech Republic is the same as the flag of the former Czechoslovakia. Upon the dissolution of Czechoslovakia in December 1992, the Czech Republic kept the Czechoslovak flag while Slovakia adopted its own flag. The first flag of Czechoslovakia was based on the flag of Bohemia and was white over red. This was almost identical to the flag of Poland (only the proportion was different), so a blue triangle was added at the hoist in 1920. The flag was banned by the Nazis in 1939 as they established a government nominally in control of Bohemia and Moravia, and a horizontal tricolour of white, red, and blue was used for the duration of the war. The 1920–1939 flag was restored in 1945.

History 
The traditional colours of the Czech lands originated from an 1192 coat of arms (depicting a rampant lion with a double silver tail on a field of red).

After the establishment of an independent Czechoslovakia in 1918, the country had been using the red and white flag of Bohemia, identical to the Polish flag. Following calls for a new flag to be adopted by the fledgling state, a committee picked a design by Jaroslav Kursa, an archivist in the Czechoslovak Ministry of the Interior. His design included the red and white horizontal stripes derived from the coat of arms of Bohemia and added a blue chevron extended halfway.

The flag was officially approved by the National Assembly of Czechoslovakia on 30 March 1920 and since then, it has been in continuous use, with the exception of the German occupation of Czechoslovakia during the Second World War. Additionally, during a short period following the Velvet Revolution, between 1990 and 1992, the Czech part of the Czechoslovak federated state adopted the previous red and white flag.

During the 1992 negotiations on the split of Czechoslovakia, a clause forbidding the use of the state symbols of Czechoslovakia by either successor state was inserted into the legislation concerning the dissolution of the federation. However, the Czech Republic kept the use of the flag.

Czechoslovakia

Dimensions 

The blazon of this flag is per pall fesswise Argent, Azure, and Gules. The flag is formed from an isosceles triangle that extends halfway along the rectangle (a common mistake is to draw it shorter) and two bands: one white and one red. The most similar foreign flag is the flag of the Philippines but the latter has dimensions 1:2, the three colors permuted, and additional golden-yellow symbols added on it.

Flag colors

Presidential standard

Another Czech official symbol is the standard of the president of the Czech Republic. It was first introduced in 1918 for the president of Czechoslovakia. The current version, which was designed by heraldist Jiří Louda, was adopted upon the creation of an independent Czech Republic in 1993.

Previous versions

See also 
 List of Czech flags

Literature
 Zbyšek Svoboda, Pavel Fojtík: brochure Naše vlajka. Vznik a vývoj české vlajky (Our Flag. Origin and evolution of the Czech flag), Libea, 2005, .
 Petr Exner, Pavel Fojtík, Zbyšek Svoboda: brochure Vlajky, prapory a jejich používání (Flags, banners and their use), Libea, 2004, .

References

External links 

History of the Czech and Czechoslovak flag 

Czech flag - facts, history, colors 
"Flag expert: Czechs only bring out their flag in emotional times" by Daniela Lazarová

Czech Republic
 
National symbols of the Czech Republic
Czech Republic
1920 establishments in Czechoslovakia